Bongi Makeba (20 December 1950 – 17 March 1985) was a South African singer-songwriter. She was the only child of singer Miriam Makeba with her first husband, James Kubay.

Biography
Angela Sibongile Makeba was born in South Africa in 1950, when her mother was 18 years old. The name Bongi by which she became known is a shortened version of her middle name Sibongile, which means "We are grateful". In 1959 her mother's career took her to New York, where she remained in exile after being barred from returning to South Africa, and in 1960 was joined by Bongi, who stayed with friends while her mother toured the world.

In 1967 she and Judy White, daughter of Josh White, signed to Buddha Records as "Bongi and Judy", their first release being "Runnin' Out" and "Let's Get Together". At the age of 17, Makeba met her American husband Harold Nelson Lee, with whom in the early to mid-1970s she made two 7" records as "Bongi and Nelson", featuring two soul tracks arranged by George Butcher: "That's the Kind of Love" backed by "I Was So Glad" (France: Syliphone SYL 533), and "Everything, For My Love" with "Do You Remember, Malcolm?" (France: Syliphone SYL 532). She recorded only one solo album, Bongi Makeba, Blow On Wind (pläne-records), in 1980. Some of her songs could be heard years later in her mother's repertoire. Two of them, "Malcolm X" (1965, 1972) and "Lumumba" (1970), extol assassinated black leaders.

Makeba had three children: Nelson Lumumba Lee (born 1968), Zenzi Monique Lee (born 1971), and a son, Themba, who died as a young child.

She died aged 34 in 1985 of complications following childbirth and was buried in Conakry, Guinea, where her mother had moved after her 1968 marriage to Stokely Carmichael.

Discography
 Blow On Wind (1980; Germany: pläne – 88234)
 Miriam Makeba & Bongi (1975; LP with Miriam Makeba; Guinea: Editions Syliphone Conakry SLP 48)

References

External links
Mention in Miriam Makeba's biography

1950 births
1985 deaths
20th-century South African women singers
Xhosa people
Deaths in childbirth
South African singer-songwriters